Đông Anh station is a railway station in Vietnam. It serves the Đông Anh district of Hanoi.

The station was the site of a military hospital for the Lính tập soldiers during the French colonial period.

References

Railway stations in Hanoi